The Primetime Emmy Award for Outstanding Production Design for a Variety, Reality or Competition Series is awarded to one television series each year. Prior to 2016, specials and series competed together. Outstanding Production Design for a Variety Special now separately recognizes specials.

In the following list, the first titles listed in gold are the winners; those not in gold are nominees, which are listed in alphabetical order. The years given are those in which the ceremonies took place.



Winners and nominations

1970s
Outstanding Art Direction for a Single Episode of a Comedy-Variety or Music Series or a Comedy-Variety or Music Special

Outstanding Art Direction for a Comedy-Variety or Music Series

1980s
Outstanding Art Direction for a Variety or Music Program

1990s

2000s

Outstanding Art Direction for a Variety, Music Program or Special

Outstanding Art Direction for Variety, Nonfiction, Reality or Reality-Competition Programming

2010s

Outstanding Production Design For Variety, Nonfiction, Reality or Reality-Competition Programming

Outstanding Production Design for a Variety, Nonfiction, Reality or Reality-Competition Series

Outstanding Production Design for a Variety, Reality or Reality-Competition Series

2020s

Programs with multiple wins

6 wins
 Saturday Night Live

2 wins
 Cher
 Portlandia

Programs with multiple nominations
Totals include nominations for Outstanding Art Direction for a Multi-Camera Series.

17 nominations
 Saturday Night Live

9 nominations
 MADtv

8 nominations
 The Carol Burnett Show
 The Voice

5 nominations
 American Idol
 Hell's Kitchen
 Tracey Takes On...

4 nominations
 Last Week Tonight with John Oliver
 Portlandia

3 nominations
 Dancing with the Stars
 Drunk History
 The Flip Wilson Show
 The Glen Campbell Goodtime Hour
 Queer Eye

2 nominations
 At Home with Amy Sedaris
 Barbara Mandrell and the Mandrell Sisters
 Bill Nye Saves the World
 Cher
 Donny & Marie
 Engineering an Empire
 Late Show with David Letterman
 The Late Show with Stephen Colbert
 The Muppet Show
 Muppets Tonight
 RuPaul's Drag Race
 The Tracey Ullman Show

Notes

References

External links
 Academy of Television Arts and Sciences website

Production Design for Variety, Nonfiction, Reality, or Reality-Competition Programming